Latvia is a European Parliament constituency for elections in the European Union covering the member state of Latvia. It is currently represented by eight Members of the European Parliament.

Current Members of the European Parliament

Elections

2004

The 2004 European election was the sixth election to the European Parliament and the first for Latvia.

2009

The 2009 European election was the seventh election to the European Parliament and the second for Latvia.

2014

The 2014 European election was the eighth election to the European Parliament and the third for Latvia.

2019

The 2019 European election was the ninth election to the European Parliament and the fourth for Latvia.

References

External links
 European Election News by European Election Law Association (Eurela)
 List of MEPs europarl.europa.eu

European Parliament elections in Latvia
European Parliament constituencies
2004 establishments in Latvia
Constituencies established in 2004
European Parliament